Alexander James Dallas (May 15, 1791 – June 3, 1844) was an officer in the United States Navy.

Early life
Dallas was born on May 15, 1791, in Philadelphia, Pennsylvania. His father, also named Alexander James Dallas, was the U.S. Secretary of the Treasury under James Madison. His brother, George M. Dallas was Vice President of the U.S. under James K. Polk.

Career
Dallas entered the Navy as a Midshipman in November 1805. He served in the War of 1812, the Second Barbary War, and in the suppression of piracy with the West Indies Squadron. Dallas also established and commanded the Pensacola Navy Yard from 1832 to 1843, and served in the Second Seminole War.

Personal life, death and legacy
In 1821, Dallas married Henrietta Constantia Meade, daughter of merchant Richard W. Meade and the sister of American Civil War general George Meade; she died in Pensacola, Florida, in 1831.

Dallas died on June 3, 1844, in Callao, Peru, and was buried at Cementerio Británico (Antiguo), in Bellavista, Callao, Peru. Fort Dallas in Florida and the U.S. Naval destroyer  are named after him.

References

1791 births
1844 deaths
United States Navy officers
Military personnel from Philadelphia
People from Pennsylvania in the War of 1812
American military personnel of the Second Barbary War
Pennsylvania Democrats